Mary, Queen of Scots is a 1971 biographical film based on the life of Mary Stuart, Queen of Scotland, written by John Hale and directed by Charles Jarrott. The cast was led by Vanessa Redgrave as the title character and Glenda Jackson as Elizabeth I. Jackson had previously played the part of Elizabeth in the BBC TV drama Elizabeth R, screened in February and March 1971, the first episode of which was also written by Hale.

The screenplay was written by John Hale and the film directed by Charles Jarrott. Like the play by Friedrich Schiller (Maria Stuart, 1800) and the opera by Gaetano Donizetti (Maria Stuarda, 1835), it takes considerable liberties with history in order to achieve increased dramatic effect, in particular two fictitious face-to-face encounters between the two queens (who never met in real life). The film received mixed reviews with criticism of the screenplay, running length and historical inaccuracies; however it received praise for the leading female performances, its production values, and musical score. At the 44th Academy Awards, the film received five nominations including Best Actress (for Redgrave).

Plot
Following the death of her husband Francis II of France in 1560, Mary, Queen of Scots (Vanessa Redgrave), returns to her native land. Though fearless, unselfish, and very beautiful, the young queen faces many challenges. As in neighbouring England, the Protestant faith has been embraced by many nobles of Scotland; in addition, the Catholic Mary has to deal with her half-brother James Stewart, Lord Moray's (Patrick McGoohan) ambitions for rule. He suggests that Mary enjoy herself in Scotland, and pass the time with dancing and feasting. Moray wants to rule Scotland while the lovely but inexperienced Mary becomes a figurehead.

Fearing that Mary has ambitions for England's throne, Elizabeth I of England (Glenda Jackson) decides to weaken her claim by sending her favourite, the ambitious Robert Dudley (Daniel Massey), to woo and marry Mary. She promises that Mary will become her heir if she agrees to the marriage. Sly Elizabeth also sends the younger, dashing but weak and spoiled Lord Darnley (Timothy Dalton) from a powerful Catholic family. Tempted by the handsome Darnley, Mary impulsively chooses him for marriage. Lord Moray, a Protestant, opposes the marriage, but Mary ignores him. She exiles Moray to strengthen her own authority. Elizabeth is satisfied that reckless, passionate Mary's romantic misadventures will keep her busy in Scotland and give shrewd, practical Elizabeth less to worry about.

Soon after the wedding, Darnley throws a childish temper tantrum, complaining that he has no real power and is merely Mary's king consort. A disillusioned Mary soon banishes Darnley from her bed and frequently consults with the gentle, soft-spoken Italian courtier David Riccio (Ian Holm). Darnley previously had him as a lover and accuses him of fathering Mary's expected child.

A group of Scottish lords persuade Darnley to help get rid of Riccio, whom they murder in Mary's presence. To escape, she persuades Darnley that the plotters will turn against him, and they flee to the safety of Lord Bothwell (Nigel Davenport). He has been an ally of Mary since her arrival in Scotland. After he defeats the plotters, Mary forces a truce among their leader Moray, Darnley and Bothwell. Mary gives birth to a son, James, who is expected to succeed both Mary and the unmarried, childless Elizabeth.

The peace is short-lived. The weak, selfish Darnley still wants power, though by now he is hideously scarred and already dying of syphilis (the pox). Mary pities him, but finds herself falling in love with the rough but loyal Bothwell. With Moray's help, they arrange for Darnley to be killed in a gunpowder explosion at his manor; Darnley escapes before the blast but is strangled. Bothwell marries Mary, and their few brief nights together are blissful. But Moray rejoins the Scottish lords and leads a rebellion against them. He forces Mary to abdicate, and she and her husband are driven into exile, Mary to England and Bothwell to Denmark. Mary's young son James is to be crowned king of Scotland (although Moray will effectively rule) and raised as a Protestant.

In England, Mary begs Elizabeth for money and an army to regain her throne. Instead Elizabeth takes her prisoner, keeping her locked away in luxurious captivity in a remote castle. Elizabeth's closest advisor, Sir William Cecil (Trevor Howard), is anxious to get rid of Mary, but Elizabeth fears to set a precedent by putting an anointed monarch to death. She also fears that Mary's death might spark a rebellion by her Catholic subjects and cause problems with powerful France and Spain. As a result, Mary is doomed to an open-ended captivity. Over time, the once proud queen of Scots succumbs to an empty routine, plotting half-heartedly to escape but growing increasingly comfortable in her luxurious seclusion. She occupies herself with a lazy daily schedule of cards, embroidery and gossip, talking vaguely of escape yet sleeping later and later each morning.

With the help of his associate Walsingham (Richard Warner), Cecil finds evidence of Mary's involvement in the conspiracy to assassinate Elizabeth known as the Babington Plot. Finally Elizabeth confronts Mary, who regains her royal pride and behaves defiantly at their secret meeting. Although Elizabeth offers her mercy if she begs for forgiveness, Mary will not beg for mercy in public. She endures the trial, conviction and execution. She knows her son James will ultimately succeed to the English throne.

Historical liberties
For dramatic effect, the film presents two meetings between the queens, although they never met in life.

The film also depicts a homosexual relationship between Darnley and Riccio not known to history, although they may have been friends initially.  The confrontation at Bothwell's Hermitage Castle seems loosely based on an actual incident at Carberry, and the film misses out the decisive Battle of Langside.

James VI and I was born in Edinburgh Castle, not Hermitage Castle, as depicted in the film.

Cast

 Vanessa Redgrave as Mary, Queen of Scots
 Glenda Jackson as Queen Elizabeth I of England
 Patrick McGoohan as Mary's half-brother James Stewart, 1st Earl of Moray
 Timothy Dalton as Mary's second husband Henry Stuart, Lord Darnley
 Nigel Davenport as Mary's third husband, James Hepburn, 4th Earl of Bothwell
 Trevor Howard as Elizabeth's advisor Sir William Cecil
 Daniel Massey as Elizabeth's lover, Robert Dudley, Earl of Leicester
 Ian Holm as Mary's advisor, David Riccio
 Andrew Keir as Ruthven
 Tom Fleming as John Ballard
 Robert James as Scottish religious reformer John Knox
 Katherine Kath as Mary's first mother-in-law, Catherine de' Medici
 Frances White as Mary's companion, Mary Fleming
 Vernon Dobtcheff as Mary's uncle, the Duke of Guise
 Raf De La Torre as her other uncle, the Cardinal of Lorraine
 Richard Warner as Elizabeth's spy master Francis Walsingham
 Bruce Purchase as the Earl of Morton
 Brian Coburn as the Earl of Huntly
 Richard Denning as Mary's first husband, King Francis II of France
 Maria Aitken as Lady Bothwell
 Jeremy Bulloch as Andrew

Production notes
The film was shot in France (Château de Chenonceau), Hermitage Castle, Scotland; Alnwick Castle, England, Bamburgh Castle, England, Parham Park, England, and Chiltern Open Air Museum in Buckinghamshire, England. The song in the opening sequence, "Vivre et Mourir", is sung by Redgrave. The lyrics are taken from a sonnet written by Mary, Queen of Scots.

Release
The film's UK premiere was the annual Royal Film Performance on 27 March 1972 at the Odeon Leicester Square, attended by Queen Elizabeth, the Queen Mother.

Reception
Vincent Canby had little good to write about the film in The New York Times, describing it as "a loveless, passionless costume drama". He wrote: "Unfortunately there is no excitement whatsoever in what Charles Jarrott, the director, and John Hale, the author of the original screenplay, have put together ... Mary, Queen of Scots intends, I assume, to illuminate history ... yet all it's really doing is touching bases, like a dull, dutiful student ... Because both Miss Redgrave and Miss Jackson possess identifiable intelligence, [the film] is not as difficult to sit through as some bad movies I can think of. It's just solemn, well-groomed and dumb."

Roger Ebert gave the film three stars and lauded the interpretation of Redgrave and Jackson, stating: "Vanessa Redgrave is a tall, straight-backed, finely spirited Mary, and Glenda Jackson makes a perfectly shrewish, wise Elizabeth."

Awards and nominations

References

External links
 
 
  
 

1971 films
1970s biographical drama films
1970s historical drama films
British biographical drama films
British historical drama films
1970s English-language films
Films set in the 1560s
Films about capital punishment
Films about Mary, Queen of Scots
Films about Elizabeth I
Cultural depictions of Catherine de' Medici
Films directed by Charles Jarrott
Films scored by John Barry (composer)
Films produced by Hal B. Wallis
Universal Pictures films
1970s British films